Alfonso Agra Tato is a Spanish actor. He is very active in some of the most popular Galician television series and has also starred in various films spoken in both Spanish and Galician, most notably Wedding Days and A esmorga.

He is also well known for his voice acting work, providing the voices for Freeza and Kami in the Galician dub of Dragon Ball Z Kai as well as the voice for Cell in Galicia's Dragon Ball GT dub.

Selected filmography

Television
 Mareas vivas – Televisión de Galicia
 Pratos combinados – Televisión de Galicia
 Terra de Miranda – Televisión de Galicia
 O show dos Tonechos – Televisión de Galicia
 Cocaine Coast – Antena 3

Film Roles
 Wedding Days
 A esmorga
 Heroine

Voice acting roles
 Dragon Ball GT (Galician dub) – Cell, Nuova Shenron and Don Para
 Dragon Ball Z Kai (Galician dub) – Freeza, Kami, Chaozu and Caroni
 Dave (Galician dub)
 Fly Away Home (Galician dub)
 The Craft (Galician dub)
 The Beautiful Country (Galician dub)

References

External links
 

1959 births
Living people
Spanish male actors
Spanish male voice actors
Male actors from Galicia (Spain)
People from Galicia (Spain)